Prochoristis crudalis is a species of moth in the family Crambidae. It is found on Cyprus, as well as in Syria.

The wingspan is about 22 mm.

References

Moths described in 1863
Cybalomiinae